The London, Quo Warranto Judgment Reversed Act 1689 is an Act of the Parliament of England (statute number 2 Will. & Mar. c. 8), the long title of which is "An Act for Reversing the Judgment in a Quo Warranto against the City of London and for Restoreing the City of London to its antient Rights and Privileges".

Enacted shortly after the Glorious Revolution, it restored various valuable privileges of the officers, companies, and corporations of the City of London that had been seized under a writ of quo warranto by Charles II and James II to augment the royal revenue. Noorthouck writes, "[T]his being the last confirmation of the rights and privileges of the citizens [of London], [it] ought justly to be known by all."

References

1689 in law
1689 in England
Acts of the Parliament of England
History of the City of London
17th century in London
Law in London